This is a List of newspapers in Sierra Leone.

Dozens of newspapers are published in Sierra Leone with 15 daily newspapers operational. Most of the newspapers are privately run and are mostly distributed around the capital of Freetown due to the low levels of literacy within the small western African nation.

allAfrica - Sierra Leone
 All People's Communication (partisan)
 Awareness Times
 Awoko
Cocorioko
 Muslim Journal
 New Citizen
 Sierra Leone Daily Mail (partisan)
 Sierra Leone Telegraph

References

External links
 
 

Newspapers published in Sierra Leone
Newspapers
Sierra Leone